Stuart Paul Cash (born 5 September 1965) is an English retired footballer who played in the Football League for Chesterfield, Brentford, Rotherham United and Shrewsbury Town as a left back. He had a long career in non-League football and entered management while still a player. He had a long association with Terry Brown and worked as Brown's assistant at Aldershot Town, AFC Wimbledon, Margate and Basingstoke Town.

Career

Early years 
After leaving school, Cash signed a one-year apprenticeship deal at the club he supported as a boy, Wolverhampton Wanderers. A broken ankle saw Cash released at the end of his first year and he dropped into non-League football and played for Southern League Midland Division clubs Bilston Town, Stourbridge and Halesowen Town. He was a part of the Halesowen Town team which reached the first round proper of the 1988–89 FA Cup.

Nottingham Forest 
Cash signed for First Division club Nottingham Forest in September 1989 for a £15,000 fee, after being scouted by assistant manager Ron Fenton while playing for Halesowen Town. Despite training with the first team squad throughout his time with the club, Cash was never in favour with manager Brian Clough and instead played for the reserve team and away on loan.

Cash joined Third Division club Rotherham United in March 1990, on a loan running until the end of the 1989–90 season. He made his professional debut and scored his first professional goal with the Millers, making eight appearances during his spell. Cash was the subject of a transfer bid by Rotherham, but the club could not meet Nottingham Forest's asking price.

Cash joined Third Division club Brentford on a three-month loan in September 1990, as a temporary replacement for the out-of-form Mark Fleming. Cash made 14 appearances for the Bees and his performances led manager Phil Holder to consider signing him on a permanent basis, though Holder's interest later cooled. Cash returned to Nottingham Forest when his loan expired and remarked in 2009 that his loan at Griffin Park was the best period of his playing career.

Cash dropped down to the Conference to sign for Wycombe Wanderers in March 1991, on a loan running until the end of the 1990–91 season. He made 12 league appearances during his spell and played in the Chairboys' 2–1 win over Kidderminster Harriers in the 1991 FA Trophy Final at Wembley Stadium. Cash was once again the subject of a bid for a permanent deal, which fell through over his wage demands.

Cash joined Third Division strugglers Shrewsbury Town on a two-month loan in September 1991. He made eight league appearances and scored one goal during his time at Gay Meadow. Cash departed Nottingham Forest in August 1992, having failed to make a single first team appearance during three years at the City Ground.

Chesterfield 
Cash signed a contract with Third Division club Chesterfield in August 1992. He failed to stake a regular place in the team and suffered an anterior cruciate ligament injury in his second season with the Spireites. Cash made 39 appearances and scored one goal before departing in August 1994.

Return to Wycombe Wanderers 
Cash rejoined Wycombe Wanderers (which by then had ascended to the Second Division) in August 1994. He failed to make an appearance for the club before departing two months later.

Return to non-League football 
Cash dropped back into non-League football to join Conference club Stevenage Borough in October 1994. He made his debut in a 2–1 win over Altrincham on 15 October. After five further appearances, Cash joined Isthmian League First Division club Chertsey Town in November 1994. He had a successful first season, with the Curfews finishing third and securing promotion to the Isthmian League Premier Division. He remained with Chertsey for a further 18 months, before departing in January 1997.

Cash moved back up to the Conference to sign for Slough Town in January 1997. He made four appearances before having a brief spell with high-flying Isthmian League First Division club Chesham United in February 1997. Nearly eight years after his departure, Cash returned to Halesowen Town in March 1997. He remained with the Southern League Premier Division club until the end of the 1996–97 season.

Cash transferred to Isthmian League Premier Division club Enfield in July 1997. He followed Enfield manager George Borg to Isthmian League First Division club Aldershot Town in September 1997. Over the course of the 1997–98 season he made 20 league appearances and scored two goals as the Shots won the Division One title. He won the Isthmian League Cup with the club in the following season. Cash made the final appearance of his career in December 1999 and retired at the end of the 1999–2000 season, having made 49 appearances and scored three goals for Aldershot.

Managerial and coaching career

Chertsey Town 
While a player at Chertsey Town, Cash also served as assistant manager.

Enfield 
Cash served as player-assistant manager under George Borg while briefly at Enfield in 1997.

Aldershot Town 
Cash began his career at Aldershot Town as player-assistant manager under George Borg, before taking on the role full-time after his retirement in 2000. He had a successful time working under Borg, winning the Isthmian League First Division in the 1997–98 season, the Isthmian League Cup in 1998–99, the Isthmian League Premier Division title in 2002–03 and four Hampshire Senior Cups. After the departure of Borg in January 2002, Cash held the role of caretaker manager and continued in the role of assistant manager after the appointment of Terry Brown two months later. The club's decision to go full-time for the 2004–05 season saw Cash leave the club in November 2004, citing work commitments.

St Albans City 
Cash joined Conference South club St Albans City as manager in November 2004, replacing Steve Castle. He lasted just eight days and two games in the role before departing the club, citing work commitments in Brighton.

Lewes 
After a break from football, Cash was appointed Steve King's assistant at Conference South club Lewes prior to the beginning of the 2005–06 season. The pair won the Sussex Senior Challenge Cup and achieved a fourth-place finish in the league. He departed the club at the end of the 2006–07 season.

AFC Wimbledon 
Cash reunited with Terry Brown at Isthmian League Premier Division club AFC Wimbledon in May 2007. Under the management of the pair, the club won the 2008 Isthmian League play-offs, the 2008–09 Conference South title and automatic promotion to The Football League with a victory over Luton Town in the 2011 Conference Premier play-off final. The pair guided the Dons to a mid-table finish in the club's first season in League Two, but a poor run of form in the first month of the 2012–13 season saw Cash and Brown removed from their posts in September 2012.

Luton Town 
Cash reunited with former Brentford and Aldershot Town teammate Paul Buckle at Conference Premier club Luton Town in January 2013, replacing Paul Carden as assistant manager under Buckle. As part of a three-way coaching team with Alan Neilson and Carl Emberson, Cash lasted just two months before following Buckle and Emberson out of Kenilworth Road, after the appointment of John Still as manager.

Margate 
Cash reunited with Terry Brown at Isthmian League Premier Division club Margate in December 2013. After finishing the 2013–14 season in mid-table, the pair steered the Gate to a third-place finish the following year and promotion through the playoffs. A poor start to the 2015–16 National League South season led to Brown and Cash being removed from their posts on 5 December 2015.

Basingstoke Town 
Terry Brown was appointed manager at National League South club Basingstoke Town in late March 2016 and installed Cash as his assistant. He departed the club at the end of the 2016–17 season.

Personal life 
Cash's sons Matty and Adam both became footballers. Matty made his debut for the Poland national team in 2021.

Career statistics

Honours 
Wycombe Wanderers
 FA Trophy: 1990–91
Aldershot Town
Isthmian League First Division: 1997–98
 Isthmian League Cup: 1998–99

References

External links 

1965 births
Living people
Sportspeople from Tipton
English footballers
English Football League players
Association football fullbacks
Wolverhampton Wanderers F.C. players
Bilston Town F.C. players
Stourbridge F.C. players
Halesowen Town F.C. players
Nottingham Forest F.C. players
Rotherham United F.C. players
Brentford F.C. players
Wycombe Wanderers F.C. players
Shrewsbury Town F.C. players
Chesterfield F.C. players
Stevenage F.C. players
Chertsey Town F.C. players
Slough Town F.C. players
Chesham United F.C. players
Enfield F.C. players
Aldershot Town F.C. players
Aldershot Town F.C. managers
St Albans City F.C. managers
AFC Wimbledon non-playing staff
Luton Town F.C. non-playing staff
Southern Football League players
Isthmian League players
National League (English football) players
Isthmian League managers
National League (English football) managers
English football managers